Louise-Jeanne Tiercelin de La Colleterie (26 December 1746 – 5 July 1779), known as Madame de Bonneval, was a mistress to King Louis XV of France from 1762 to 1765.

Biography 
Louise-Jeanne was born in Mortagne on  26 December 1746, as the daughter of Jeanne-Jacqueline Vautorte and a guardsman named Pierre Tiercelin de La Colleterie. At the age of 11, she was recruited by Dominique Guillaume Lebel to be trained with the purpose of becoming a petite maîtresse (unofficial mistress) of King Louis XV of France in Parc-aux-Cerfs, and was finally installed as such at the age of 16 in 1762. When she arrived, Marguerite-Catherine Haynault and Lucie Madeleine d'Estaing were already staying at the Parc-aux-Cerfs.

Louise, reportedly, threw the gifts the king had given her upon him while screaming that she hated him and called him ugly, which the king was not offended but was rather amused by. 

She had a son by the king: Benoît-Louis Le Duc (1764-1837). When the abbé de Lustrac encouraged her to plot to have her son legitimised, the king discontinued the affair and had her confined to the Bastille on 25 July 1765; she was released with a pension of 30.000 livres on 18 August. She did not marry but lived as a boarder in several convents and had several love affairs, notably with the Comte de Langeac and the American adventurer Paul Jones. She was often placed in debt, spending about 100.000 livres annually, which was paid by the royal treasury; both by Louis XV and his successor Louis XVI. 

She died of cancer on 5 July 1779, at the age of 32.

References 

1746 births
1779 deaths
18th-century French people
Mistresses of Louis XV
People imprisoned by lettre de cachet
Prisoners of the Bastille